Åmøya is an island in the municipality of Meløy in Nordland county, Norway.  The  island lies west of the mainland, east of the island of Bolga, and south of the island of Meløya.  The island is connected to the mainland by a series of small bridges over  the island of Grønnøya and several other small islands between Åmøya and the village of Engavågen on the mainland.  The island is very mountainous, the highest mountain is the  Risnestinden. There were 112 residents living on the island in 2016.

See also
List of islands of Norway

References

Meløy
Islands of Nordland